"Running" is the debut single by the band InSoc (Information Society) originally released on the Creatures of Influence album in 1985. The single for Running was distributed to club DJs, and became a favorite all over clubs, particularly in the Latin clubs of New York City. The single was later remixed by Tommy Boy Records and the remix single was released and became even more of a club hit, eventually reaching number 2 on the Dance/Club Airplay charts. Tommy Boy Records signed Information Society in 1986 and their self-titled album soon followed, featuring a mix of the single. In 1988 Information Society's self-titled album was released and went platinum.

Unlike other singles in the catalogue, "Running" does not feature Kurt Harland on lead vocals, as the song was written and recorded by short-lived band member Murat Konar, who left the band in 1985 and would later be an integral part of the development of both SoundEdit (a Mac hosted sound editing application) and Adobe Flash applications. For a very long period of time, the band would not perform "Running" live, requesting not to be asked to play it and generally refusing all questions pertaining to their dislike of the song. It is generally believed this is due to the song being very difficult to play live, and because the song was written at a particularly fractious period in the band's life.

In early 2008, Murat Konar joined Paul Robb, Jim Cassidy, and Kurt Harland onstage in San Francisco to sing "Running". It was the first (and only) time Konar and the rest of the band had ever performed "Running" live together; the handful of 80s era 'live' performances of "Running" by Konar and the band were actually live vocals performed over prerecorded  instrumental tracks.

Track listings

12" single (1985) 
 Running
 Running (Instrumental)

12" and CD maxi-single (1986) 
 Running (Vocal Remix) (7:41)
 Running (Percappella) (3:55)
 Running ("The Nest" Remix) (5:25)
 Running (Instrumental) (7:42)

 Remixed by Joey Gardner and "Little Louie" Vega.
 The "Vocal Remix" is the same as the version featured on the album.

CD maxi-single: Tommy Boy Silver Label (2001)
 Running (Calderone Leather Radio Edit)
 Running (Robbie Rivera Diskofied Vocal Edit)
 Running (Calderone Leather Mix)
 Running (Robbie Rivera Diskofied Vocal Mix)
 Running (Robbie Rivera Smooth House Mix)

 The 12" single release also featured the "Calderone Dub".
 A dub version by Robbie Rivera of unknown origin also exists.

Running 2K14 Remixes (2014)
AM Remixes
 Running 2K14 (Lem Spingsteen Soulful House Mix)
 Running 2K14 (Alias Rhythm Remix)
 Running 2K14 (Todd Terry Remix)
 Running 2K14 (Eric Kupper Mix)
 Running 2K14 (Lem Springsteen & Drew Kingsbury Strobelight Mix)
 Running 2K14 (Todd Terry Dub)
PM Remixes
 Running 2K14 (Marcos Carnaval & Paulo Jeveaux Club Mix)
 Running 2K14 (David Anthony Mix)
 Running 2K14 (Chachi Remix)
 Running 2K14 (Dezza Remix)
 Running 2K14 (Rudedog NY Remix)
 Running 2K14 (Marcos Carnaval & Paulo Jeveaux Tribal Mix)

References

1985 debut singles
Information Society (band) songs
1985 songs